Laraman is a surname. Notable people with the surname include:

Aaron Laraman (born 1979), English cricketer
Peter Laraman (1940–2020), English footballer

See also
Larman